Baldwin Hills is a neighborhood within the South Los Angeles region of Los Angeles, California. It is often referred to as the Black Beverly Hills. 

It is home to Kenneth Hahn State Regional Park and to Village Green, a National Historic Landmark.

History

19th century
Baldwin Hills and other surrounding geography are named for the 19th century horse racing and land developer, Lucky Baldwin.
 Ran historic early 19th century eastern hills Rancho land grant.
 Sanchez Adobe de Rancho La Cienega o Paso de la Tijera. The adobe was once the center of the rancho. In the 1920s, an addition was built linking the structures and the building was converted into a larger clubhouse for the Sunset Golf Course.
 Rancho Rincon de los Bueyes: original early 19th century western section Rancho land grant.

20th century
 The 1932 Los Angeles Olympics housed athletes at the Olympic Village in Baldwin Hills. It was the site of the very first Olympic Village ever built, for the 1932 Los Angeles Summer Olympic Games. Built for male athletes only, the village consisted of several hundred buildings, including post and telegraph offices, an amphitheater, a hospital, a fire department, and a bank. Female athletes were housed at the Chapman Park Hotel on Wilshire Boulevard. The Olympic Village was demolished after the Summer Olympic Games.
 On December 14, 1963, a crack appeared in the Baldwin Hills Dam impounding the Baldwin Hills Reservoir. Within a few hours, water rushing through the crack eroded the earthen dam, gradually widening the crack until the dam failed catastrophically at 3:38 p.m. When the crack was discovered, police with bullhorns urged the evacuation of the area, but six people were killed. Two hundred homes were completely wiped out, and an additional 1500 to 2000 houses and apartment buildings were damaged, and most of Baldwin Vista and the historic Village Green community were flooded. The dam's failure was ultimately determined to be the result of subsidence, caused by overexploitation of the Inglewood Oil Field. The dam's failure prompted the Los Angeles Department of Water and Power to close and drain other small local reservoirs with similar designs, such as the Silver Lake Reservoir. The Baldwin Hills Dam was not rebuilt—instead, the empty reservoir was demolished, filled with earth, landscaped, and converted to Kenneth Hahn Regional Park.
 During the summer of 1985, a brush fire along La Brea Avenue spread up the canyon towards the homes along Don Carlos Drive in Baldwin Hills Estates. Many homes were destroyed despite the efforts of the Los Angeles Fire Department to suppress the flames. The fire killed three people and destroyed 69 homes; the arsonist was never caught.

Geography

Baldwin Hills is bounded by La Cienega Boulevard to the west, Crenshaw Boulevard to the east, Stocker Street to the south and Obama Boulevard to the north with Martin Luther King Jr. Boulevard forming the northeast dividing line between Baldwin Hills and Crenshaw Manor. It is bordered on the west by Culver City and it shares the eastern border of Crenshaw Boulevard with Leimert Park.

The namesake mountain range is part of the neighborhood.

Neighborhoods

Neighborhoods within Baldwin Hills include:
 Baldwin Hills Estates is locally known as "The Dons", because all but one street begins with the formal title of the city’s original land holders. The oldest two streets in the neighborhood are Don Luis Drive and Don Mariano Drive. Old maps show those streets with the names Sprague Drive and Maryann Drive. Susan Miller Dorsey High School has called its school mascot  The Dorsey Dons and Donnas after this neighborhood. The neighborhood is east of La Brea, southwest of Santo Tomas Drive, south of the Jim Gilliam Recreation Center and north of Stocker Street). It is sometimes called "the Black Beverly Hills". The neighborhood is characterized by hillside houses with swimming pools, and modern  condominiums (the latter often jut out from steep hillsides, perched on stilts).
 Baldwin Vista is bounded by La Cienega Boulevard to the West, La Brea Avenue to the East, Coliseum Street to the North, and Kenneth Hahn Park to the South.
 Village Green, originally named Baldwin Hills Village, is located north of Baldwin Vista. It is a historic Mid-Century modern "garden city" developed by Walter H. Leimert (1877–1970) multi-family residential. It was designated as a National Historic Landmark in 2001. The units are now condominiums on very spacious grounds, attracting seniors, young families, and design professionals as residents.
 Baldwin Village - In 1988, Baldwin Village became be a distinct community in the city’s General Plan, and signs were to be posted to identify the area. It is bounded by La Brea Avenue, Marlton Avenue, Rodeo Road, Martin Luther King Jr. Boulevard and Santo Thomas Drive.
 The southernmost portion of Baldwin Hills is outside the Los Angeles city limits. Along with View Park-Windsor Hills and  Ladera Heights, it resides in an unincorporated area of Los Angeles County. Stocker Street divides Baldwin Hills from the View Park neighborhood. The northeast face of the hills overlooks the Baldwin Hills Crenshaw Plaza shopping mall and Marlton Square's Kaiser Permanente medical office building.

According to the Mapping L.A. project, Baldwin Hills is part of the larger neighborhood of Baldwin Hills/Crenshaw.

Climate

Parks and recreation

 Baldwin Hills Scenic Overlook is located at 6300 Hetzler Road in Culver City, CA. The  park is open daily from 8 a.m. to sunset. The Visitor Center is not currently open. The park includes an amphitheater, drinking water, the Evan Frankel Discovery Center, gardening boxes, picnic tables, a permeable parking lot ($6), toilets, and walking paths with a central feature known as the Culver City Stairs. The Visitor Center has a comprehensive guide to the native plants of the area and history of Culver City. On a clear day the Overlook's platform offers exceptional views spanning the Pacific Ocean to the west, the Hollywood Sign to the north, and downtown Los Angeles to the east.
 Kenneth Hahn State Regional Park is located at 4100 South La Cienega Boulevard. It is a 401 acre recreation and sports area.
 Norman O Houston Park: is located at 4800 South La Brea Avenue.
 Jim Gilliam Park & Recreation Center is located at 4000 South La Brea Avenue. It is home to the Jim Gilliam Senior Citizen Center

Library
The Los Angeles Public Library operates the Baldwin Hills Branch Library. It is located at 2900 La Brea Avenue.

Education

Baldwin Hills is served by Los Angeles Unified School District. Baldwin Hills also has a charter school. The schools operating within Baldwin Hills borders are:
 Baldwin Hills Elementary School
 Audubon Middle School
 Susan Miller Dorsey High School
 Windsor Math/Science/Aerospace Magnet (K–5, zoned only for Kindergarten)
 Hillcrest Drive Elementary School.
 Marlton School
 New Designs Charter School

In popular culture

Television
From 2007 to 2009, BET aired Baldwin Hills, a program featuring several African-American teenagers and their lives in the upper-class Los Angeles community.

The show is very similar in nature to such MTV programs as Laguna Beach: The Real Orange County, The Hills, and the online series The Suburbs, as it features African-Americans of upper-middle-class families who divide their time between attending school, playing sports, shopping at high-end stores, and driving expensive cars. The series lasted for three seasons.

Literature
Orson Scott Card's urban fantasy novel Magic Street is set in Baldwin Hills.

Notable residents

 Tom Bradley
 Ray Charles
 David S. Cunningham Jr.
 Danny Elfman
 Allyson Felix
 Michael J. Fox
 Mike Love
 Jimmy Pardo
 Susan Rasky
 John Singleton
 Bubba Smith
 Tina Turner
 Paul Williams
 Nancy Wilson
 Cal Worthington
 Jim Gilliam
 Ice Cube

See also

 Village Green, Los Angeles

References

External links

 Baldwin Hills Estates Homeowners Association website
 Friends of the Baldwin Hills website
 The Baldwin Hills Conservancy website
 Official Kenneth Hahn State Recreation Area website
 lacounty.info: Kenneth Hahn Recreation Area
 Baldwin Hills Scenic Overlook Park website
 Village Green website
 Village Green: historic architecture article
 1932 Los Angeles Olympic Athlete's Village in the Baldwin Hills: history
 Baldwin Hills Dam history
 University Park Family—a collaborative online community: focused on University Park, Expo Park and the surrounding areas.
 Leimert Park Beat—a collaborative online community focused on Leimert Park: "The Soul of Los Angeles and the African American cultural center of the city."

 
Neighborhoods in Los Angeles
Baldwin Hills (mountain range)
Crenshaw, Los Angeles
South Los Angeles
Venues of the 1932 Summer Olympics
Olympic Villages